Augusto Vittorio Vècchi (22 December 1842, Marseille – 6 September 1932, Forte dei Marmi), known under the pseudonym Jack La Bolina, was an officer in the Regia Marina (Italian navy) and a writer on maritime subjects. He has been called "the Italian Captain Marryat".

Biography
Vecchi graduated from the Regia Scuola di Marina di Genoa (Royal Naval School Genoa) and became a midshipman in 1861. He became a sub-lieutenant in 1863 and a lieutenant in 1866. He participated in the Battle of Lissa in 1866 and resigned from the Regia Marina in 1872.

Vecchi was an editor for Caffaro; giornale politico quotidiano and the Roman newspaper Fanfulla. In 1879 he founded the Regio Yacht Club Italiano.

Selected works

References

1842 births
1932 deaths
Italian male writers
Regia Marina personnel
Maritime writers